The men's 100 metre breaststroke event at the 2016 Summer Olympics took place between 6–7 August at the Olympic Aquatics Stadium.

Summary
Great Britain's Adam Peaty defeated the field with a new world record to become the country's third gold medalist in this event, since Duncan Goodhew topped the podium in 1980 and Adrian Moorhouse in 1988. He jumped to an immediate lead, and never looked back, charging ahead of the field with his trademark high stroke rate to lower his own world record at 57.13. Peaty's time also gave him the largest margin of victory in the event's Olympic history, sparing 1.56 seconds over South Africa's defending champion Cameron van der Burgh, who won a silver in 58.69. Meanwhile, U.S. swimmer Cody Miller overcame his rib condition to set a new American record of 58.87 for the bronze medal, edging out his teammate Kevin Cordes (59.22) to fourth by 0.35 of a second.

Backed by a raucous home crowd, Brazil's João Gomes Júnior managed to pull off a fifth-place finish in 59.31, almost a tenth-second margin ahead of Japan's Yasuhiro Koseki (59.37) and his countryman Felipe França Silva (59.38). Swimming on the outside lane, Kazakhstan's Dmitriy Balandin rounded out the final with an eighth-place time in 59.85. For the first time in Olympic history, all eight finalists finished the race in less than a minute.

Earlier in the prelims, Peaty established a new world-record time in 57.55 to lead all swimmers for the top seed, not only clipping 0.37 seconds off his own standard one year earlier, but also erasing van der Burgh's 2012 Olympic record by almost a second.

Notable swimmers missed the final roster, including Australia's Jake Packard, Peaty's teammate and 2015 world bronze medalist Ross Murdoch, Lithuania's Giedrius Titenis, and Hungary's Dániel Gyurta, who elected not to do the swimoff with New Zealand's Glenn Snyders (a matching 1:00.26) on the morning prelims.

The medals for the competition were presented by Sheikh Ahmed Al-Fahad Al-Ahmed Al-Sabah, Kuwait,  IOC member, and the gifts were presented by Mr. Andrey Kryukov, Bureau Member of the FINA.

Records
Prior to this competition, the existing world and Olympic records were as follows.

The following records were established during the competition:

Competition format

The competition consisted of three rounds: heats, semifinals, and a final. The swimmers with the best 16 times in the heats advanced to the semifinals. The swimmers with the best 8 times in the semifinals advanced to the final. Swim-offs were used as necessary to break ties for advancement to the next round.

Results

Heats

Semi-finals

Semifinal 1

Semifinal 2

Final

References

Men's 00100 metre breaststroke
Olympics
Men's events at the 2016 Summer Olympics